C. Y. O'Connor College of TAFE (also known as C. Y. O'Connor Institute), established in July 1994, is a Technical and Further Education institute servicing the Wheatbelt region of Western Australia.

It was named for engineer C. Y. O'Connor who designed the Goldfields Water Supply Scheme, which has served Northam and other towns in the central and eastern Wheatbelt since the 1900s.

The college won awards in 2006 for its training activities.

Locations
Campuses

 Northam
 Narrogin
 Merredin
 Moora (completed 2000)

Satellite centres

 Jurien Bay
 Kellerberrin
 Kondinin
 Pingelly
 Quairading

References

External links

TAFE WA
Educational institutions established in 1994
Wheatbelt (Western Australia)
1994 establishments in Australia